The following is a list of buildings designed by Irish architect Andrew Devane as part of Robinson, Keefe & Devane.

Unrealised projects

References 

Devane